The 2018–19 Copa Argentina (officially the Copa Total Argentina 2018–19 for sponsorship reasons) was the tenth edition of the Copa Argentina, and the eighth since the relaunch of the tournament in 2011. The competition began on 16 January 2019 and ended on 13 December 2019.

River Plate defeated Central Córdoba (SdE) in the final to win their third title. As champions, they qualified for the 2020 Copa Libertadores group stage and the 2019 Supercopa Argentina.

Rosario Central, the defending champions, were eliminated by Sol de Mayo in the Round of 64.

Teams
Eighty-seven teams took part in this competition: All twenty-six teams from the Primera División; twelve teams of the Primera B Nacional; six from the Primera B, four from the Primera C; three from the Primera D and all thirty-six teams from Federal A.

First Level

Primera División
All twenty-six teams qualified.

 Aldosivi
 Argentinos Juniors
 Atlético Tucumán
 Banfield
 Belgrano
 Boca Juniors
 Colón
 Defensa y Justicia
 Estudiantes (LP)
 Gimnasia y Esgrima (LP)
 Godoy Cruz
 Huracán
 Independiente
 Lanús
 Newell's Old Boys
 Patronato
 Racing
 River Plate
 Rosario Central
 San Lorenzo
 San Martín (SJ)
 San Martín (T)
 Talleres (C)
 Tigre
 Unión
 Vélez Sarsfield

Second Level

Primera B Nacional
The best twelve teams at the 13th round of 2018–19 tournament qualified.

 Agropecuario Argentino
 Almagro
 Arsenal
 Atlético de Rafaela
 Central Córdoba (SdE)
 Gimnasia y Esgrima (M)
 Independiente Rivadavia
 Mitre (SdE)
 Nueva Chicago
 Platense
 Sarmiento (J)
 Villa Dálmine

Third Level

Primera B Metropolitana
The top-six teams at the 19th round of 2018–19 Primera B tournament qualified.

 Acassuso
 All Boys
 Atlanta
 Barracas Central
 Deportivo Riestra
 Estudiantes (BA)

Torneo Federal A
All teams of the 2018–19 tournament qualified.

 Altos Hornos Zapla
 Alvarado
 Atlético Paraná
 Boca Unidos
 Chaco For Ever
 Cipolletti
 Crucero del Norte
 Defensores (P)
 Defensores de Belgrano (VR)
 Deportivo Camioneros
 Deportivo Madryn
 Deportivo Maipú
 Deportivo Roca
 Desamparados
 Douglas Haig
 Estudiantes (RC)
 Estudiantes (SL)
 Ferro Carril Oeste (GP)
 Gimnasia y Esgrima (CdU)
 Gimnasia y Tiro
 Huracán Las Heras
 Independiente (N)
 Juventud Antoniana
 Juventud Unida (G)
 Juventud Unida Universitario
 Racing (C)
 San Jorge (T)
 San Lorenzo (A)
 San Martín (F)
 Sansinena
 Sarmiento (R)
 Sol de Mayo
 Sportivo Belgrano
 Sportivo Las Parejas
 Unión (S)
 Villa Mitre

Fourth Level

Primera C Metropolitana
The top-four teams at the 19th round of 2018–19 Primera C tournament qualified.

 Deportivo Armenio
 Dock Sud
 Laferrere
 Midland

Fifth Level

Primera D Metropolitana
The top-three teams at the 15th round of 2018–19 Primera D tournament qualified.

 Argentino (M)
 Atlas
 Real Pilar

Round and draw dates

Regional Round
This round was organized by the Consejo Federal.

Round I
In the Round I, 20 teams from Torneo Federal A participated. The round was played between 16 and 20 January, on a home-and-away two-legged tie. The 10 winning teams advanced to the Round II.

|-

|-

|-

|-

|-

|-

|-

|-

|-

|-

|}

First leg

Second leg

Round II
In the Round II, 10 qualified teams from the Round I and the remaining 16 teams from Torneo Federal A participated. The round was played between 20 and 28 January, on a home-and-away two-legged tie with best team in the Torneo Federal A hosting the second leg. The 13 winning teams advanced to the Final Round.

|-

|-

|-

|-

|-

|-

|-

|-

|-

|-

|-

|-

|-

|}

First leg

Second leg

Final Rounds

Draw
The draw for the Final Rounds was held on 31 January 2019, 12:30 at AFA Futsal Stadium in Ezeiza. The 64 qualified teams were divided in four groups. Teams were seeded by their historical performance and Division. Champions of AFA tournaments playing in Argentine Primera División were allocated to Group A. The matches were drawn from the respective confronts: A vs. C; B vs. D. Some combinations were avoided for security reasons.

Bracket

Upper bracket

Lower bracket

Round of 64
The Round of 64 had 13 qualified teams from the Regional Round (13 teams from Torneo Federal A), 13 qualified teams from the Metropolitan Zone (6 teams from Primera B Metropolitana; 4 teams from Primera C and 3 teams from Primera D), 12 teams from Primera B Nacional and 26 teams from Primera División. The round was played between 26 February and 21 July, in a single knock-out match format. The 32 winning teams advanced to the Round of 32.

Round of 32
This round had 32 qualified teams from the Round of 64. The round was played between 14 July and 19 September, in a single knock-out match format. The 16 winning teams advanced to the Round of 16.

Round of 16
This round had the 16 qualified teams from the Round of 32. The round was played between 7 September and 10 October, in a single knock-out match format. The 8 winning teams advanced to the Quarterfinals.

Quarterfinals
This round had the 8 qualified teams from the Round of 16. The round was played between 11 and 25 October, in a single knock-out match format. The 4 winning teams advanced to the Semifinals.

Semifinals
This round had the 4 qualified teams from the Quarterfinals. The round was played on 14 November 2019, in a single knock-out match format. The 2 winning teams advanced to the Final.

Final

Top goalscorers

Team of the tournament

See also
 2018–19 Argentine Primera División
 2018–19 Primera B Nacional
 2018–19 Torneo Federal A

References

External links
 Official site 
 Copa Argentina on the Argentine Football Association's website 

2018
Argentina
2018 in Argentine football
2019 in Argentine football